Vincent Joseph Flynn (April 6, 1966 – June 19, 2013) was an American author of political thriller novels featuring the fictional assassin Mitch Rapp. He was a story consultant for the fifth season of the television series 24. He died of prostate cancer on June 19, 2013.

Biography

Early life and education
Flynn was one of seven children born to Terry and Kathleen Flynn, and a graduate of Saint Thomas Academy (1984) and the University of St. Thomas with a B.A. in economics (1989).

Early career
After graduating, Flynn went to work for Kraft Foods as an account and sales marketing specialist. In 1991, he left Kraft to pursue a career as an aviator with the United States Marine Corps. One week before leaving for Officer Candidate School, he was medically disqualified from the Marine Aviation Program.

In an effort to overcome the difficulties of dyslexia, Flynn forced himself into a daily writing and reading routine. His writing influences included Leon Uris, Tom Clancy, Ernest Hemingway, John Irving, Robert Ludlum, J.R.R. Tolkien, and Gore Vidal.

Writing and media career
Flynn's newfound interest in fiction motivated him to begin work on a novel of his own. While employed as a bartender in the St. Paul area, he completed his first book, Term Limits, which he self-published. Of the book, Flynn said: "I had just finished reading The Government Racket: Washington Waste from A to Z, by Martin L. Gross. It is without a doubt the most disheartening and enlightening book about politics that I've ever read. I was out jogging one day wondering what it would take to really change Washington, when my thoughts turned to a friend who had been shot and killed in Washington, D.C., several summers earlier. As I continued running, a story started to unfold."

Pocket Books published the hardcover edition of Term Limits in 1998, and a mass market paperback in 1999, which spent several weeks on The New York Times bestseller list. Subsequent works, including Flynn's 1999 novel Transfer of Power, his 2000 novel The Third Option, and his 2001 novel Separation of Power, also appeared on the New York Times bestseller list, with Separation of Power rising as high as No. 7.

Flynn's fifth novel, Executive Power, was published in hardcover by Atria Books in 2003, followed by his sixth novel, Memorial Day in 2004, his seventh, Consent To Kill, in 2005, his eighth, Act Of Treason, in 2006, his ninth, Protect And Defend, in 2007, and his tenth, Extreme Measures, in 2008. Except for Term Limits, his books centered around counterterrorism agent Mitch Rapp.

Flynn wrote six New York Times bestsellers for Atria Books, and had a contract for four more. He remembered deciding between following the path that was the most uncomfortable—continuing with what looked to be a promising career as a commercial real estate leasing agent—or taking a big risk and starting a new career as a writer: "I look back on it now and I couldn't be happier with my decision, but at the time I remember a lot of people thought I was nuts."

In February 2008, Flynn agreed on film and book projects with CBS Corporation units CBS Films and Simon & Schuster/Atria Books. Lorenzo di Bonaventura was negotiating to produce Mitch Rapp films. The first film, American Assassin, was released in 2017. Atria Books got worldwide rights to four of Flynn's books. In August 2010, Flynn signed a two-book deal for a new series that he would have co-written with Brian Haig, a retired Army lieutenant colonel. He was a frequent guest on The Glenn Beck Radio Program on the Fox News Channel, and on Dan Barreiro's radio program on Twin Cities station KFAN.

Personal life
Flynn lived with his wife, Lysa, and their three children in the Twin Cities (Minneapolis-St. Paul) area.

Illness and death
On February 1, 2011, in his fan newsletter, Flynn announced that he was being treated for advanced Stage III prostate cancer. He died of a rare form of aggressive prostate cancer in Saint Paul, aged 47, on June 19, 2013.

Bibliography

Novels
Mitch Rapp series
Mitch Rapp is a fictional undercover CIA counterterrorism agent. Rapp's primary focus is to thwart terrorist attacks on the U.S., and he is presented as an aggressive operative willing to take measures more extreme than might commonly be considered acceptable. His constant frustration with procedures and red tape is a major theme in the series.

Starting in 2015 with The Survivor, the Mitch Rapp series has been continued by Kyle Mills.

Related book

Term Limits is not part of the Mitch Rapp series, but takes place in the same universe. Scott Coleman from the Mitch Rapp series appears in the book, which takes place after the events of Kill Shot.

Adaptations

 American Assassin (2017), film directed by Michael Cuesta, based on the novel American Assassin

References

External links

Official Vince Flynn website
Vince Flynn website (UK)
Fantastic Fiction Author Page
Internet Book List Author Page
The World of Vince Flynn - TheThirdOption.net
Audio Interview with Dr. Blogstein's Radio Happy Hour
Transcript of interview with Hugh Hewitt
Audio interview with Hugh Hewitt - part 1 of 3
Audio interview with Hugh Hewitt - part 2 of 3
Audio interview with Hugh Hewitt - part 3 of 3

1966 births
2013 deaths
American male novelists
American thriller writers
Writers from Minneapolis
Techno-thriller writers
20th-century American novelists
21st-century American novelists

American Roman Catholics 
Deaths from prostate cancer
Deaths from cancer in Minnesota
Writers from Saint Paul, Minnesota
University of St. Thomas (Minnesota) alumni
Novelists from Minnesota
20th-century American male writers
21st-century American male writers